Maldybulakia is a genus of freshwater arthropod which lived during the Devonian period. Maldybulakia is known from three species, M. angusi and M. malcolmi from Australia, and M. mirabilis from Kazakhstan. Although it was originally described as a myriapod-like animal, it was later considered related to the xiphosurans, a group including modern horseshoe crabs.

Discovery and etymology 
In 1992, the type species of Maldybulakia is described from the Pragian to Emsian-aged Sheshen'karinskaya Formation (also known as the Sheshenkarinskoy Suite) in central Kazakhstan, with scientific name Lophodesmus mirabilis. The genus name Lophodesmus came from the Greek lophos ("tubercle") and desmos ("bond"), and the species name mirabilis means "wonderful" in Latin. However, this genus name is already used for an extant genus of myriapod, and in 1998, the new genus name Maldybulakia, named after Maldybulak Farm in the Bayanaul District, Pavlodar Region in Kazakhstan, was given to the animal. In addition, in 1998, two new species of Maldybulakia were described from two localities in the Devonian of New South Wales. M. angusi is described from the Lochkovian to earliest Pragian-aged Sugarloaf Creek Formation, M. malcomi is from Saltwater Creek Forest Road, usually regarded as Middle Devonian in age though some fossil contents give estimation between the Givetian to the Frasnian. The two species were named after Australian musicians Malcolm and Angus Young.

Morphology 
M. malcomi lacked long paratergal spines, posteromedian spines, and tuberculation. M. angusi had considerable serial variation on the pleurotergites. M. angusi is characterized with very long paratergal spines on the most bilobate trunk pleurotergites.

Paleoecology 

All species of Maldybulakia are known from freshwater sediments. According to the only associated fossils, the abundant lycopod flora with M. malcolmi and the presence of spiracles suggests terrestrial habits for Maldybulakia.

Classification 

Due to lack of information on the cephalic structure, appendages, position of the gonopore and genital morphology, it is controversial where to place Maldybulakia within Arthropoda. In 1992, it was classified as Arthropoda incertae sedis, as its characteristics did not permit its identification as a members of Kampecarida, Euthycarcinoidea and Arthropleurida. In 1998, it was classified as a possible Dignatha in Myriapoda, rather than the alternatively proposed Crustacea. However, after 2010s, Maldybulakia is commonly treated as an unspecified xiphosuran genus, due to morphological similarity with the synziphosurine Willwerathia.

References 

Xiphosura
Devonian animals of Australia
Fossils of Australia
Devonian animals of Asia
Fossils of Kazakhstan
Fossil taxa described in 1998
Prehistoric arthropod genera